Björkénska priset is a scientific award given by Uppsala University. It is awarded for outstanding research in science and the theoretical branches of medicine. The prize was established in 1893 from a donation given by university lecturer  (1833–1893). Björkén was a physician and medical assistant professor in surgery and obstetrics at Uppsala. The prize was first awarded in 1902 on the day of his death.

The Björkén Prize is alternately awarded for achievement in  four different fields:
Botany, zoology, and landscape planning
Chemistry, mineralogy, metallurgy, and geology
Physics, mechanics, and engineering science
Theoretical disciplines of medical sciences

Winners

References

External links
 Björkénska priset website

Uppsala University
Swedish awards
Awards established in 1902
Swedish science and technology awards